Brahmanbaria is a district in eastern Bangladesh located in the Chittagong Division. Geographically, it is mostly farmland and is topographically part of the Gangetic Plain. It is bounded by the districts of Kishoreganj and Habiganj to the north, Narsingdi District and Narayanganj to the west, Comilla to the south, and the Indian state of Tripura to its east. It was a part of Comilla until 15 February 1984.

History

 
Brahmanbaria was a part of Samatata region of the ancient Bengal. The area Syed Mahmud resided in was named Kazipara (Kazi being a variant of Qadi) after him, and his mazar (mausoleum) remains there.

The leader of the Baro-Bhuiyan zamindars, Isa Khan, had his first and temporary capital situated in Sarail. During the Mughal era, Brahmanbaria was famous for producing quality cloth muslin.

Brahmanbaria was made one of the three subdivisions of Comilla District by the British colonialists in 1790. The Brahmanbaria Municipality was established in 1868. During the 19th century, Brahmanbaria produced great nationalist leaders like Nawab Syed Shamsul Huda, who became president of the All India Muslim League in 1921 and Barrister Abdur Rasul, a front ranking leader of Indian National Congress. When the Swadeshi movement began in the wake of the 1905 Partition of Bengal, Brahmanbaria-born revolutionary Ullaskar Datta Aviram was convicted for throwing bomb explosion and was deported to the Andamans. It became part of East Pakistan in 1947. Upon encouragement of Oli Ahad, a Brahmanbarian Bengali Language Movement leader, the movement obtained momentum in this district in 1952.

During the Bangladesh Liberation War in 1971, Mohammad Mostafa Kamal faced a heroic death in an encounter with the Pakistani army at Daruin in Akhaura. One of the most distinguished Brahmanbarian military generals Shakil Ahmed was murdered in the Bangladesh Rifles revolt in 2009. In 2015, a pot of 200-year-old coins was found in the district's Akhaura Upazila. There were nearly 500 coins at the Temple of Durga in Mogra Union and contained images of British queen Elizabeth I and were from 1804, 1814 and 1836. According to the police, the coins were handed over to the Department of Archaeology.

In March 2013, a deadly tornado killed at least 31 people in 25 villages and caused serious damage.

Demographics 

According to the 2011 Bangladesh census, Brahmanbaria District had a population of 2,840,498, of which 1,366,711 were males and 1,473,787 females. Rural population was 2,392,005 (84.21%) while the urban population was 448,493 (15.79%). Brahmanbaria district had a literacy rate of 45.29% for the population 7 years and above: 45.74% for males and 44.88% for females.

Muslims make up 92.51% of the population, while Hindus are 7.46% of the population.

Administration 

Brahmanbaria District, previously a subdivision of Comilla district (formerly Tippera district till 1960), was established in 1984. The district has 4 municipalities, 39 wards, 97 mahallas, 9 upazilas, 98 union parishads, 1081 moussakas and 1329 villages.

The administrative seat and largest city is Brahmanbaria. The towns of Akhaura and Ashuganj also rank in the top three of the district.

Upazilas 
Brahmanbaria district is divided into nine upazilas (subdistricts) as below:
Brahmanbaria Sadar Upazila
Kasba Upazila
Akhaura Upazila
Ashuganj Upazila
Bancharampur Upazila
Bijoynagar Upazila
Nasirnagar Upazila
Nabinagar Upazila
Sarail Upazila

Parliamentary constituencies 
There are six Jatiyo Shangshad constituencies in the district. These constituencies and the current Members of Parliament are:
 National seat no 243 Brahmanbaria-1 (Current MP, Bodruddoza Md. Farhad Hossain)
 National seat no 244 Brahmanbaria-2 (Current MP, Advocate Abdus Sattar Bhuiyan)
 National seat no 245 Brahmanbaria-3 (Current MP, R. A. M. Obaidul Muktadir Chowdhury)
 National seat no 246 Brahmanbaria-4 (Current MP, Anisul Huq, Minister of Law)
 National seat no 247 Brahmanbaria-5 (Current MP, Mohammad Ebadul Karim Bulbul)
 National seat no 248 Brahmanbaria-6 (Current MP, AB Tajul Islam)

District Magistrates 
Deputy Commissioner (DC), or District Magistrate, is the chief administrative and revenue officer of Brahmanbaria District. The following is a list of those that held this office:

Economy 

Brahmanbaria is one of the fastest growing districts in the country. The major industries of Brahmanbaria District have been: agriculture, fishing, power and electricity, and natural gas. 30% of its population is below the poverty threshold. It has a labour force of 1,800,000 that are skilled in agricultural, industrial, and service sectors. As of 2010, it had an unemployment rate of 3.8%.

Power and gas

Brahmanbaria's Titas gas is the largest gas field of Bangladesh. It supplies natural gas to Dhaka and most other parts of the nation. Currently the government is drilling new wells.

In some other parts of Brahmanbaria, gas was found. It resulted in an abrupt fall in the price of gas. Many parts of the country people are using gas in many illegal ways. Now the government is trying to solve that issue.

Transport 

This district has the largest railway junction in the country at Akhaura. It connects to Kulaura and Chhatak with the Akhaura–Kulaura–Chhatak line, to Laksam and Chittagong with the Akhaura–Laksam–Chittagong line, and to Tongi and Bhairab with the Tongi–Bhairab–Akhaura line. There are about ten railway stations in the district. Recently the government of India shipped machines of the Palatana project from Kolkata to Agartala by using the Ashuganj river port on Meghna in Brahmanbaria district. Rail networks linking it to other parts of the country include the Parabat Express and Kalni Express. Brahmanbaria connects with the Asian Highway Network through the N2 highway and there is also the prominent N102 highway. To connect with India, government of both Bangladesh and India is building 15 km railway from Akhaura to Agartala.

Prime Minister of Bangladesh Sheikh Hasina gave the Government of India permission to use the Port of Ashuganj. In addition, Akhaura Station will be connected to Agartala.

Tourism 
Brahmanbaria has a number of tourist attractions and sites dating back many centuries. The Kharampur Mazar Sharif is a mausoleum complex located in Akhaura which attracts hundreds of visitors. It contains the tomb of Syed Ahmad Gesudaraz, a 14th-century Islamic preacher who took part in the Conquest of Sylhet before settling in Kharampur where he was martyred. During the dewani of Shahbaz Khan in 1650, the Hatirpul was constructed. It was a bridge built over the canal mainly for elephant pass. The Mughal dewans used to communicate by the elephant in this road and also took rest near this bridge. In 1662, the Arifil Mosque was constructed by Shah Arif in Sarail. There are unknown tombs located near the mosque, supposedly the wives of Isa Khan. The 18th century Haripur Barabari was a residential palace located in Nasirnagar and many movies have been filmed there. The India-Bangladesh Border Haat located in Kasba is a weekly marketplace and allows communication with the people of the neighbouring country. Sports fans assemble at the Niaz Mohammad Stadium which was constructed in 1934.

Criticism
In 2015, Brahmanbaria faced problems of road blocks due to political agitation. The situation did not last very long before being resolved. This region also faced with clashing between two groups. In 2015 a man was killed for facing problems between two groups. Former Chief Justice of Bangladesh, Surendra Kumar Sinha had said while he was delivering his speech in Brahmanbaria that smuggling was hurting the national the economy. Gold and dollar are going out of the country, he said.

Notables

Notes

References

External links 

 
 http://www.arafatmiah.com/bhadughar/

 
Districts of Chittagong Division
Districts of Bangladesh